The Tailor Who Sold His Soul to the Devil is a Mexican fairy tale collected by Vicente T. Medoza and Virginia Rodriguez Rivera de Mendoza in Piedra Gorda.

It is Aarne–Thompson type 1096, The tailor and the ogre in a sewing contest.

Synopsis
The Devil offers a tailor a bargain; the tailor says he can have his soul if he beats him in a sewing contest.  The Devil uses a long thread, which tangles; the tailors uses a short one and wins.

Expression
The story concludes with the observation that this is why mothers warn their daughters against long threads by calling them "the Devil's thread."

References

Tailor Who Sold His Soul to the Devil
Tailor Who Sold His Soul to the Devil
Tailor Who Sold His Soul to the Devil
Tailor Who Sold His Soul to the Devil
ATU 1000-1199